The 2019-20 Bangladesh Championship League was 8th edition of the  league since its founded 2012 by the Bangladesh Football Federation (BFF). A total 13 teams would've participated in the league. The league would've commenced from 28 March 2020. On 16 March 2020, Bangladesh Football Federation  suspended all competition, including this league, due to the coronavirus pandemic. On 20 May 2020, the Federation and Professional Football League Committee officially cancelled this season of the league.

Bangladesh Police FC were the defending champions.

Venue
All matches were held at the BSSS Mostafa Kamal Stadium in Dhaka, Bangladesh.

League table

References

2020 in Bangladeshi football